Simon Hedley Burrows (8 November 1928 – 5 August 2015) was the Bishop of Buckingham from 1974 to 1994 and the first area bishop under the diocesan area scheme of 1984.

Early life
Burrows was born on 8 November 1928. He was the grandson of Leonard Burrows (Bishop of Sheffield) and Neville Lovett (Bishop of Salisbury) and son of Hedley Burrows (Dean of Hereford). He was educated at Eton and King's College, Cambridge.

Ordained ministry
He was made a deacon at Michaelmas 1954 (26 September), by Cyril Easthaugh, Bishop of Kensington, and ordained a priest the Michaelmas following (25 September 1955), by William Wand, Bishop of London — both times at St Paul's Cathedral.
He served his curacy at St John's Wood, after which he was Chaplain of Jesus College, Cambridge.  Following this he was  Vicar of Wyken and then (his final appointment before his ordination to the episcopate) of Holy Trinity Fareham. He was consecrated a bishop on 18 October 1974 by Michael Ramsey, Archbishop of Canterbury, at Westminster Abbey.

In retirement he continued to serve as an assistant bishop in the Diocese of Winchester for some time.

Death
He died on 5 August 2015 after a short illness.

References

1928 births
2015 deaths
People educated at Eton College
Alumni of King's College, Cambridge
Bishops of Buckingham
20th-century Church of England bishops